Vanessa Claire Stewart (born June 21, 1974) is an American actress, producer, and writer.

Early life and education
Born in New Orleans, Louisiana, Stewart attended the Webster Conservatory for the Performing Arts in St. Louis, Missouri. After graduating, she was admitted to the Oxford School of Drama in England.

Career
In 2004, Stewart received an LA Weekly Theatre Award for Best Leading Female Performance, for her gender-bending portrayal of Alex in Los Angeles director Brad Mays' controversial multi-media production of Anthony Burgess's A Clockwork Orange at the ARK Theatre Company in 2003. She also directed the popular Return to the Forbidden Planet while at ARK.

In 2008, she co-wrote Louis and Keely: Live at the Sahara with actor Jake Broder for Sacred Fools Theatre. The show became an overnight success and was discovered by filmmaker Taylor Hackford. Hackford later became director of the show and brought Louis and Keely to a successful 8 month run at the Geffen Playhouse in 2009. While at the Geffen, Stewart met her future husband actor French Stewart in the green room before his performance in "Matthew Modine Saves the Alpacas".

In 2010, she received an LA Weekly Theatre Award, a Garland and an Ovation Award for Louis and Keely Live at the Sahara, for her portrayal of legendary jazz vocalist Keely Smith.

In 2012, Stewart wrote Stoneface for Sacred Fools Theater Company, about the life of Buster Keaton, starring her husband French Stewart. Stoneface won the 2013 LA Weekly award for best production. Stoneface appeared in the 2013–2014 season at Pasadena Playhouse.

In 2015, thanks to theater producer Hershey Felder, Louis and Keely: Live at the Sahara moved to a commercial run in Chicago at the Royal George Theater starring Tony Award winner Anthony Crivello as Louis Prima. The run officially began April 9 and closed eight weeks later on May 17. An additional run at Laguna Playhouse was announced for February 2016.

In 2019, her original musical about serial killer HH Holmes entitled Deadly premiered at Sacred Fools Theatre Company. Written by Stewart and composer Ryan Johnson, the musical later moved to Webster Conservatory for further development and premiered a new revision online in December 2020 due to Coronavirus restrictions on live performances.

Stewart has appeared in various film and television productions, including Chase The Slut, Shakespeare's Merchant, Joan of Arcadia, Rules of Engagement, and The List.

Personal life

She moved to Los Angeles in 1999 where she met and married her first husband, Lance Arthur Smith. They divorced in 2005. In 2009, while performing at the Geffen Playhouse, she met actor French Stewart. They married in 2011 and had a daughter, Helene Claire, in 2013. Once remarried, she took the surname Stewart. Stewart lives in Los Angeles, California.

Filmography

Film

Television

Awards and nominations
Ovation Awards
2009: Won the award for Lead Actress in a Musical for the role of Keely Smith in "Louis & Keely, Live at the Sahara"
2010 Ovation Awards: Award for Best Musical for the Geffen Playhouse production of "Louis and Keely: Live at the Sahara".

Los Angeles Drama Critics Circle Awards

 2009 Production of the Year: Louis and Keely: Live at the Sahara

LA Weekly Awards

 Best Actress award for her role as Alex in ARK Theatre Company's 'A Clockwork Orange'
2013 LA Weekly Awards: Production of the year: Stoneface at Pasadena Playhouse

References

External links

Living people
Alumni of the Oxford School of Drama
Actresses from Los Angeles
Actresses from New Orleans
American producers
Writers from Los Angeles
Writers from New Orleans
21st-century American women
1974 births